The Battle of the Lys, also known as the Fourth Battle of Ypres, was fought from 7 to 29 April 1918 and was part of the German spring offensive in Flanders during the First World War. It was originally planned by General Erich Ludendorff as Operation George but was reduced to Operation Georgette, with the objective of capturing Ypres, forcing the British forces back to the Channel ports and out of the war. In planning, execution and effects, Georgette was similar to (although smaller than) Operation Michael, earlier in the Spring Offensive.

Background

Strategic developments
The front line ran from north-north-east to south-south-west. The Lys River, running from south-west to north-east, crossed the front near Armentières in the middle of this zone. The front was held by the Belgian Army in the far north, by the British Second Army (under Plumer) in the north and centre and by the British First Army (under Horne) in the south.

Prelude

Tactical developments
The German attacking forces were the Sixth Army in the south (under Ferdinand von Quast), and the Fourth Army in the north (under Sixt von Armin). Both armies included substantial numbers of the new stosstruppen, trained to lead attacks with the new stormtroop tactics.

The British First Army was a relatively weak force; it included several worn-out formations that had been posted to a "quiet sector". This included two divisions of the Portuguese Expeditionary Corps, which were undermanned, lacked almost half of their officers, had very low morale and were set to be replaced the day of the German attack.

German plan of attack
The German plan was to break through the First Army, push the Second Army aside to the north, and drive west to the English Channel, cutting off British forces in France from their supply line which ran through the Channel ports of Calais, Dunkirk and Boulogne.

Battle

Battle of Estaires (9–11 April)
The German bombardment opened on the evening of 7 April, against the southern part of the Allied line between Armentières and Festubert. The barrage continued until dawn on 9 April. The Sixth Army then attacked with eight divisions. The Portuguese division was overrun and withdrew towards Estaires after hours of heavy fighting. The British 55th (West Lancashire) Division, to the south of the Portuguese in a more defensible position, pulled back its northern brigade and held its ground for the rest of the battle, despite attacks from two German reserve divisions. The British 40th Division (to the north of the Portuguese) collapsed under the German attack and fell back to the north.

Horne committed his reserves (First King Edward's Horse and the 11th Cyclist Battalion) to stem the German breakthrough but they too were defeated. There they were finally halted by British reserve divisions. On 10 April, the Sixth Army tried to push west from Estaires but was contained for a day; pushing north against the flank of the Second Army, it took Armentières.

Battle of Messines (10–11 April)

Also on 10 April, German Fourth Army attacked north of Armentières with four divisions, against the British 19th Division.

By 11 April, the British situation was desperate; it was on this day that Haig issued his famous "backs to the wall" order.

Battle of Hazebrouck (12–15 April)
On 12 April, the Sixth Army renewed its attack in the south, towards the important supply centre of Hazebrouck, another  to the west. On 13 April they were stopped by the First Australian Division, which had been transferred to the area. The British Fourth Division defended Hinges Ridge, the Fifth Division held Nieppe Forest and the 33rd Division was also involved.

Battle of Bailleul (13–15 April)
Plumer assessed the heavy losses of the Second Army and the defeat of his southern flank and ordered his northern flank to withdraw from Passchendaele to Ypres and the Yser Canal; the Belgian Army to the north conformed.

Retirement from Passchendaele Ridge

On 23 March, Haig had ordered Plumer to make contingency plans to shorten the line along the Ypres Salient and release troops for the other armies. On 11 April, Plumer authorised a withdrawal of the southern flank of the Second Army and ordered the VIII and II corps in the Passchendaele Salient to retreat the next day into the Battle Zone, behind outposts left in the Forward Zone of the British defensive system. The divisional commanders were ordered that the Forward Zone must be held and that the Germans must not be given the impression that a withdrawal was in progress. At noon on 12 April, the VIII Corps ordered the infantry retirement to begin that night and the 59th Division was withdrawn and transferred south, to be replaced by part of the 41st Division.

During 13 April, General Headquarters (GHQ) discussed the retirements in the Lys valley, which had lengthened the British front line and Plumer agreed to a retirement in the Ypres Salient to the Mt Kemmel, Voormezeele ( south of Ypres), White Château ( east of Ypres) to Pilckem Ridge defence line but ordered only that artillery ammunition be carried to the rear; the 4th Army reported on 14 April, that the British were still occupying the Passchendaele Salient. The next day was quiet in the salient and the withdrawal of the II Corps and XXII Corps divisions was covered by the outposts in the original front line and artillery, which was divided into some active batteries which fired and a greater number of batteries kept silent, camouflaged and not to fire except in an emergency. Plumer gave orders to begin the retirement by occupying the line before the night of  while maintaining the garrisons in the outpost line and holding the Battle Zone with a few troops as an intermediate line.

On 16 April, patrols went forward during the morning and found the area between the old and new front lines to be empty, the Germans still apparently in ignorance of the retirement; one patrol captured a German officer scouting for observation posts who did not know where the British were. Only in the late afternoon did German troops begin to close up to the new line and the British troops in the Battle Zone easily repulsed the German infantry, the 4th Army diary recorded that patrols discovered the withdrawal at  that afternoon.

Battle of Merckem (17 April)
On 17 April, the Belgian Army defeated an attack from Houthulst Forest (The Battle of Merckem) against the 10th and 3rd Belgian divisions from Langemarck to Lake Blankaart by the 58th, 2nd Naval and the 6th Bavarian divisions, with help from the II Corps artillery. The Germans captured Kippe but were forced out by counter-attacks and the line was restored by nightfall. On the afternoon of 27 April, the south end of the outpost line was driven in when Voormezeele was captured, re-captured and then partly captured by the Germans; another outpost line was set up north-east of the village. Belgian losses were 619 killed, wounded or missing. The Germans lost between 1922 and 2354 men, of which 779 were taken prisoner.

First Battle of Kemmel (17–19 April)
The Kemmelberg is a height commanding the area between Armentières and Ypres. On 17–19 April, the German Fourth Army attacked and was repulsed by the British.

Battle of Béthune (18 April)
On 18 April, the German Sixth Army attacked south from the breakthrough area toward Béthune but was repulsed.

Second Battle of Kemmel (25–26 April)
French General Ferdinand Foch had recently assumed supreme command of the Allied forces and on 14 April agreed to send French reserves to the Lys sector. A French division relieved the British defenders of the Kemmelberg.

From  the German Fourth Army made a sudden attack on the Kemmelberg with three divisions and captured it. This success gained some ground, but there was no progress made toward a new break in the Allied line.

Battle of the Scherpenberg (29 April)
On 29 April, a final German attack captured the Scherpenberg, a hill to the north-west of the Kemmelberg.

Aftermath

Analysis
However, they failed in their main objective to capture Hazebrouck and force a British withdrawal from the Ypres salient. By 29 April, the German high command realized they could no longer achieve their objectives and called off the offensive.

Casualties
Total casualties since 21 March were British:   and German:  In 1978 Middlebrook wrote of  casualties,   and  Middlebrook estimated French casualties as  German as   wounded. In 2006 Zabecki gave   and  casualties. The German ace Manfred von Richthofen, the "Red Baron," was killed in action.

Notes

Footnotes

References

Books
 
 
 
 
 
 
 

Theses
 

Websites

Further reading

External links

 CWGC map
 The Battle of the Lys 1918, 4th Battle of Ypres: Kemmel
 Operation Georgette
 Portugal in WWI
 List of British Forces involved in the battles

1918 in Belgium
April 1918 events
Battle honours of the Rifle Brigade
Battles of the Western Front (World War I)
Battles of World War I involving Australia
Battles of World War I involving Belgium
Battles of World War I involving Canada
Battles of World War I involving France
Battles of World War I involving Germany
Battles of World War I involving Portugal
Battles of World War I involving the United Kingdom
Battles of World War I involving the United States
Battles in Flanders
Conflicts in 1918
Battle